The American College of Medical Genetics and Genomics (ACMG) is an organization composed of biochemical, clinical, cytogenetic, medical and molecular geneticists, genetic counselors and other health care professionals committed to the practice of medical genetics.

History
The ACMG, incorporated in 1991, stated mission to give national representation to providers of genetic services and their patients with genetic disorders; to provide education and resources for the medical genetics profession; to improve the health of the public by promoting the development and implementation of methods to diagnose, treat and prevent genetic disease.

In 1993, ACMG publishes the first edition of the ACMG Standards and Guidelines for Clinical Genetic Laboratories and supports the formation of the American Board of Genetic Counseling.

The first Annual Clinical Genetic Meeting is held in 1994. Next year, the College becomes a full member of the Council of Medical Specialty Societies.

ACMG has an Official Journal, Genetics in Medicine. The first issue was released in 1998.

In 2011, the organization's board of directors voted to change its name from the "American College of Medical Genetics" to "American College of Medical Genetics and Genomics".

Mission statement
ACMG aims to develop clinical practice guidelines; laboratory services directories, databases, population screening guidelines and to establish uniform laboratory standards, quality assurance and proficiency testing.

Ethical Guidelines for Pediatric Genetic Testing
American Academy of Pediatrics  AAP with ACMG posted guidelines in dealing with the Ethical Issues in Pediatric genetic testing.

References

External links
 Official Homepage

Medical associations based in the United States
Organizations established in 1991
1991 establishments in the United States
Medical and health organizations based in Maryland